Kızılpınar can refer to:

 Kızılpınar, Çerkezköy
 Kızılpınar, Çorum
 Kızılpınar, Karakoçan